It's About Us is the only studio album by American duo Alex & Sierra, released on October 7, 2014 by Columbia Records. Their debut single and the album's lead single "Scarecrow" was written by the duo along with Martin Johnson and Sam Hollander and was released on June 23, 2014, while "Little Do You Know" was released as the second single from the album.

The album debuted at number 8 on the Billboard 200 selling 27,000 copies within its first week of release.

Background and development
In 2013, Alex & Sierra won Season 3 of The X Factor. Their prize included a $1 million recording contract from Sony Music Entertainment. Following their win on The X Factor, Alex & Sierra announced they would be making their debut album 'quick' and 'right'. They've worked with Julian Bunetta, Sam Watters, John Shanks, Toby Gad, Jason Mraz and One Direction member Harry Styles, Grammy award-winning singer/songwriter John Legend also made a contribution to the early stages of the album, however the track was not selected to be on the album. On May 3, 2014, Alex & Sierra revealed their debut single, "Scarecrow".

Alex & Sierra  have commonly described the album as one that is not just filled with slow or upbeat songs.  They hope it becomes one of those albums that you can listen to without the songs ever sounding the same. Also, in an interview with Glamour.com the two shared that they had never written a song before.  The duo described it as a really laid-back and magical experience and added that they wrote a total of twenty songs in five days.

The first single "Scarecrow" was released on June 23, 2014 and was written by the duo, Martin Johnson and Sam Hollander. They described the single as "a song about hope, It's about believing in a relationship so strongly that a lack of communication isn't enough for you to give up on the other person. Everyone has trouble communicating sometimes... Or all the time, and everyone deserves to be believed in."

Promotion
Alex & Sierra began promoting the album by performing on Today and Yahoo! Music on June 23, 2014 as part of the promotion for their single "Scarecrow". They also promoted the single on popular blogging sites such as perezhilton.com and rickey.org A lyric video featuring puppets instead of the singers themselves was released on May 27, 2014. While they released the official music video for the song on July 11, 2014.

Reception

Critical
Matt Collar of AllMusic gave a positive review of the album stating "Alex & Sierra have delivered an album that showcases their crowd-pleasing musical chemistry."

Commercial
It's About Us debuted at number 9 on the New Zealand Albums Chart the week ending October 13, 2014. The album debuted at number 8 on the Billboard 200 with 27,399 copies sold within its first week of release. The album has sold 86,000 copies in the United States as of August 2016.

Track listing

Notes
  significes a co-producer

Personnel

Lead vocals – Alex & Sierra 
Background vocals – John August, Johan Carlsson, Sam Hollander, Martin Johnson, Kyle Moorman, Brandon Paddock, Ali Tamposi 
Violin – Paul Cartright, Stephan Hovsepian, Carrie Kennedy, Emily Moore, Joel Pargman, Jen Simone, Audrey Solomon, Ina Velli
Guitar – Josh Cumbee, Toby Gad, Martin Johnson, Alex Kinsey, Jamie Scott, John Shanks
Piano – Sierra Deaton, Toby Gad, Martin Johnson, Steve Mac, Jamie Scott, John Shanks,
Cello – Ira Glansbeek, John Krovoza 
Trumpet – Sean Eric 
Percussion – Martin Johnson
Rhythm/string arrangements – Nick Squires, Steve Mac
Producers: Julian Bunetta, Johan Carlsson, Ian Franzino, Toby Gad, Steve Mac, John Ryan, John Shanks
Vocal producers: Steve Shebby, Peter Carlsson, Steve Mac, David "DQ" Quinones
Engineers: Nico Grossfield, John Hanes, Sam Holland, Martin Johnson, Paul Lamalfa, Chris Laws, Edwin Menjivar, Brandon Paddock, Dann Pursey, John Ryan, John Shanks
Assistant engineers: Ian Franzino, Keith Munson
Programming: Toby Gad, Martin Johnson, Kyle Moorman, Brandon Paddock, John Ryan, John Shanks, John August, Julian Bunetta, Johan Carlsson, Josh Cumbee
Mixing: Michael H. Brauer, Serban Ghenea, Ash Howes, Joe Zook
Mixing assistant: Ryan Lipman, Brandon Paddock
Photography: Sierra Deaton, Sami Drasin, Alex Kinsey, Chris Whittle 
Artwork: Pamela Littky, Sierra Deaton, Alex Kinsey

Charts

Release history

References

2014 debut albums
Alex & Sierra albums
Columbia Records albums
Sony Music albums
Albums produced by Johan Carlsson